Salvatore Niffoi (born 1950, in Orani) is an Italian writer.

Niffoi is a representative of the so-called Sardinian Literary Nouvelle Vague, or Sardinian Literary Spring, i. e. the Sardinian narrative of today, which was initiated by Giulio Angioni, Salvatore Mannuzzu and Sergio Atzeni, following the work of individual prominent figures such as Grazia Deledda, Emilio Lussu, Giuseppe Dessì, Gavino Ledda, Salvatore Satta. 
His prose is mostly a mixture of Italian and Sardinian.

Niffoi lives in Orani, a small village of Barbagia, in the province of Nuoro, where he was a middle school teacher until 2006. He started his career as a novelist in 1997, with his first work, Collodoro. In 2006, with the novel La vedova scalza he won the Campiello Prize.

Works 
 Collodoro, Solinas, 1997
 Il viaggio degli inganni, Il Maestrale, 1999 
 Il postino di Piracherfa, Il Maestrale, 2000  
 Cristolu, Il Maestrale, 2001  
 La sesta ora, Il Maestrale, 2003
 La leggenda di Redenta Tiria, Adelphi, 2005
 La vedova scalza, Adelphi, 2006
 Ritorno a Baraule, Adelphi, 2007
 L'ultimo inverno, Il Maestrale, 2007  
 Collodoro, Adelphi, 2008
 Il pane di Abele, Adelphi, 2009
 Paraìnas – Detti e parole di Barbagia, Adelphi, 2009
 Il bastone dei miracoli, Adelphi, 2010
 Il lago dei sogni, Adelphi, 2011
 I malfatati: romanzi 1999–2007, Il Maestrale, 2011
 Pantumas, Feltrinelli, 2012
 Il venditore di metafore, Giunti Editore, 2017

Bibliography 
Goffredo Fofi, Sardegna, che Nouvelle vague!, Panorama, November 2003 .
A. M. Amendola, L'isola che sorprende. La narrativa sarda in italiano (1974–2006), Cagliari, CUEC 2008.
Birgit Wagner, Sardinien, Insel im Dialog. Texte, Diskurse, Filme, Tübingen, Francke Verlag, 2008.

References

External links 
CultBook La vedova scalza Niffoi https://www.youtube.com/watch?v=zBPjnL5VQRw 
Salvatore Niffoi a Ventimila righe sotto i mari: intervista all’autore in http://librisenzacarta.it/2009/07/17/salvatore-niffoi-a-ventimila-righe-sotto-i-mari-intervista-all-autore/ [accessed 8 June 2013 ]

21st-century Italian novelists
People from the Province of Nuoro
1950 births
Living people
Italian male novelists
Premio Campiello winners
21st-century Italian male writers